The Sub-Saharan Informer is a Pan African newspaper produced weekly across several countries of Sub-Saharan Africa. It was Established in 1999 or 2000

References

External links 
 

English-language newspapers published in Africa
Newspapers published in Ethiopia